Tay Street is a major thoroughfare, part of the A989, in the Scottish city of Perth, Perth and Kinross. Planned in 1806 and completed around 1885, it is named for the River Tay, Scotland's longest river, on the western banks of which it sits. The street runs from the confluence of West Bridge Street and Charlotte Street in the north to a roundabout at Marshall Place and Shore Road in the south.

Thomas Hay Marshall and his father-in-law, Thomas Anderson (owner of the former Blackfriars lands), who were responsible for the construction of much of Georgian Perth, made the first steps in the creation of Tay Street in the late 18th century when they constructed Atholl Crescent and Atholl Street in the north and Marshall Place in the south. The sections in between were gradually filled in over the course of the next century.

"A curving line of elegant buildings," Tay Street links the city's two main parks, the North Inch and the South Inch.

Water Vennel, one of Perth's many vennels, leads between Tay Street and Watergate.

Notable buildings

Located along the western side of the street's  course are several notable buildings dating from the 19th century, designed by several of Scotland's leading architects. The below, ordered from north to south, are all listed structures at Historic Environment Scotland.

2 Tay Street
Royal George Hotel – has an entrance from Tay Street
Former Middle Church and halls, 4–6 Tay Street
Municipal Buildings, 1–5 High Street and 8–18 Tay Street
2 High Street – has an entrance from Tay Street
St Matthew's (formerly West) Church
26 Tay Street – formerly Perth Savings Bank
Victoria Buildings, 36–44 Tay Street
"Gowrie House", 46–52 Tay Street
54 Tay Street
Sheriff Court, former site of Gowrie House, 46–52 Tay Street
County Buildings, 62–72 Tay Street
Perth Water Works, now The Fergusson Gallery; address is Marshall Place, but it its eastern elevation is on Tay Street

Although not a listed structure, situated immediately to the north of the railway bridge is the former Volunteer Drill Hall.

Perth Baptist Church formerly stood at the southern corner of Tay Street and Canal Street. Built on the site of Perth Opera House, it was destroyed in a fire in 1984. A modern building now stands in its place. The Baptists moved a new building in the Letham area of the city.Parth Baptist Church – Places of Worship in Scotland

Architects
Robert Smirke designed the Sheriff Court and County Buildings, which were built in 1819. 

Glasgow's John Honeyman designed St Matthew's Church, by far the most prominent structure on the street, erected in 1871.

Perth architect Andrew Heiton was responsible for 26 Tay Street, completed around 1873, the Victoria Buildings, dating to 1872, 46–52 Tay Street (possibly), completed in 1870, and the municipal building that runs between 8 and 18 Tay Street, which were built in 1881.

David Smart designed the building at 54 Tay Street (part of 1–3 South Street), which was built between 1863 and 1866. His office was located in the Victoria Buildings at 42 Tay Street.

John Young's effort was Perth's former museum building, built between 1879 and 1881, which backs up to the Greyfriars Burial Ground. The building was extended in 1895, and a fire in 1987 resulted in the northern end being demolished and rebuilt.

George Penrose Kennedy Young designed the municipal building at the corner of 2 High Street, which was erected in 1899. His firm also designed the extension of the fire-damaged Perth Museum.

Images

References

External links
"PERTH WALK, Scotland Walking Tour in 4K" – Tay Street portion

Streets in Perth, Scotland
Victorian architecture in the United Kingdom
Renaissance architecture in Scotland